Colton is a civil parish in the South Lakeland District of Cumbria, England.  It contains 44 listed buildings that are recorded in the National Heritage List for England.  Of these, three are listed at Grade II*, the middle of the three grades, and the others are at Grade II, the lowest grade.  The parish is in the Lake District National Park and is located between Windermere and Coniston Water.  It is mainly rural, and the villages and settlements include Colton, Colthouse, Finsthwaite, Lakeside, Oxen Park, Nibthwaite, Bouth, Rusland, Newby Bridge, and Greenodd.  Many of the listed buildings are houses and associated structures, farmhouses and farm buildings.  The other listed buildings include churches and structures in or near the churchyard, bridges, a potash kiln, a former bobbin mill, three milestones, two memorials, and a hotel.


Key

Buildings

Notes and references

Notes

Citations

Sources

Lists of listed buildings in Cumbria
Listed buildings